Londonderry is an electoral district of the Legislative Assembly in the Australian state of New South Wales. It is represented by Prue Car of the Labor Party.

It includes the suburbs of Berkshire Park, Caddens, Cambridge Park, Castlereagh, Claremont Meadows, Colyton, Jordan Springs, Llandilo, Londonderry, Melonba, Mount Pleasant, North St Marys, Oxley Park, Ropes Crossing, Shanes Park, St Marys, Tregear, Werrington, Werrington County, Werrington Downs, Whalan, Willmot and parts of Agnes Banks, Cranebrook, Emerton, Kingswood, Lethbridge Park, Marsden Park, Mount Druitt and Orchard Hills.

Members for Londonderry

Election results

References

Londonderry
Londonderry
1988 establishments in Australia